Harijan Raja Ratnayake (born 8 December 1974) is a retired Sri Lankan athlete who specialised in the 400 metres hurdles. He represented his country at the 2000 Summer Olympics and the 2001 World Championships without qualifying for the semifinals.

His personal best of 49.44, set in 2000, is the current national record.

Competition record

References

External links
 

Sri Lankan male hurdlers
1974 births
Living people
Athletes (track and field) at the 1998 Asian Games
Athletes (track and field) at the 2000 Summer Olympics
Olympic athletes of Sri Lanka
Asian Games competitors for Sri Lanka
20th-century Sri Lankan people
21st-century Sri Lankan people